The Milliarium Aureum, also known by the translation Golden Milestone, was a monument, probably of marble or gilded bronze, erected by the Emperor Augustus near the Temple of Saturn in the central Forum of Ancient Rome. All roads were considered to begin at this monument and all distances in the Roman Empire were measured relative to it. On it perhaps were listed all the major cities in the empire and distances to them, though the monument's precise location and inscription remain matters of debate among historians.

According to Philip Schaff, the phrase "all roads lead to Rome" is a reference to the Milliarium Aureum—the specific point to which all roads were said to lead. A marble structure speculated to be the base of the milestone is present in the Roman Forum.

History

Augustus, as curator viarum, erected the monument in 20 BCE. It probably received the name Milliarium Aureum soon after its inauguration. It symbolized the starting point of the Roman road system to the rest of Italy and to all the imperial possessions.

Architecture and style

The plan of the monument is among those missing from the recovered fragments of the Forma Urbis. The remaining fragments for this area of the Roman Forum are all in the so-called slab V-11, Stanford University#19 (Temple of Saturn with the frontal section and staircase, but the Rostra section is missing, Temple of Concordia, and Temple of the Deified Vespasian). Information from ancient authors is also very scarce, so there are many problems of interpretation concerning the exact nature of the Milliarium Aureum.

Location
It is certain that it was "hard by [under] the Temple of Saturn at the head of the Roman Forum", but its exact location is still unknown. Due to archaeological data from excavations by Kähler in 1959, which seem to confirm data from excavations by Bunsen in 1833, many scholars now believe that it was located at the southeast corner of the podium of the Rostra Augusti on a symmetrical axis with the Umbilicus urbis Romae.

Style, structure, and dimensions
The Milliarium Aureum seems to have been a marble column sheathed in gilded bronze; according to C. Hülsen, a huge marble cylinder was found in 1835 near the Temple of Saturn and it still had bronze hooks. The whole monument likely had the standard form of a Roman milestone. Some scholars think that the Milliarium Aureum was made entirely of gilded bronze, while others believe only the inscribed letters were gilded bronze.

The problem of the inscription
Ancient sources never directly say what was inscribed on the Milliarium Aureum, so every idea one may have about the inscription must be considered a modern inference based on the typical form, structure and function of Roman milestones.

The main hypotheses about the inscription suggest that it included:
 Nothing, except for the name and title of the Emperor.
 The names of the most important cities of Italy and of the Roman Empire in 20 BCE, with the distances of these from Rome. According to a vague sentence by Pliny the Elder (Naturalis Historia, 3.66), the distances in Roman miles were measured starting from the city gates and not from the location of the Milliarium (thus with a difference of ca. 1 mile): Via Appia from Porta Capena (to Brundisium, Greece and the Oriental Provinces); Via Salaria and Via Nomentana from Porta Collina and Via Flaminia (to Northern Italy, Raetia, Noricum, Pannonia and Illyricum); Via Aurelia (to the Galliae and Hispaniae); Via Ostiensis (to Ostia and the main harbours of Corsica and Sardinia, Sicilia and Africa).
 The names of the roads out of Rome and the men of praetorian rank Augustus had made curatores viarum to see to their upkeep, based on Cassius Dio's account of the erection of the monument.

The problem of the marble fragments labeled "Milliarium Aureum"
The ca. 3-m diameter marble fragments labeled "Milliarium Aureum" with an anthemion frieze decoration have long been considered part of the base of the monument. However, there is no direct evidence for this, considering as well that the diameter of this base seems to be too large for a standard milliarium.

According to Richardson, the ruins labeled "Milliarium Aureum" can be considered pertinent only if the column of the monument was of a colossal scale, of almost 3 m diameter and not 1.15 m:
Still less credible is that the carved stone members labelled Milliarium Aureum at the northwest end of the Forum Romanum today actually belonged to the base of that monument. The frieze decorated with an anthemion belongs relatively high on a building, and both elements are of a diameter equal to that of the Umbilicus Romae, too large for a milestone, unless it were of colossal scale.

See also

 Kilometre zero
 Milion, an equivalent monument in Ancient Constantinople

References

Samuel Ball Platner, A Topographical Dictionary of Ancient Rome, London: Oxford University Press (1929), p. 342 .

External links
UCLA Digital Roman Forum page for the "Miliarium Aureum" Archaeological discussion and 3D reconstruction
Stanford University Forma Urbis Romae: slabs of the Forum Area with the "Miliarium Aureum" (the "Miliarium Aureum" is a missing part near the letters "...ordia")
The book Article by C. Hülsen about the "Miliarium Aureum" at Lacus Curtius

Roman Forum
Roman roads
Kilometre-zero markers
Milliarium
Monumental columns in Rome
Rome R. X Campitelli